Platyptilia anniei is a moth of the family Pterophoridae. It is known from Bolivia, Ecuador, Peru and Venezuela.

The wingspan is 19–24 mm. Adults are on wing in September, October, December, February, May and June.

External links

anniei
Moths described in 1997
Taxa named by Cees Gielis